FUYING & SAM, or FS, is a pop duo from Malaysia consist of members Chronicles Ong Fu Ying 王赴穎 and Sam Chin Neng 沈展寧 (Sam). The duo released their mini album Love Protection 1.0 in 2012.

History

2012: Formation
The duo was formed in 2012. Initially, the two attended a vocal training course and were later selected to sing the theme song for local movie Kepong Gangster. The pairing worked and their then record label decided to market them as a duo instead of solo singers.

2015: Moved to Taiwan and Second Album, Close To
Following the success of their earlier EPs and debut 2014 full-length album, Love Temperature, the duo decided to be based in Taiwan. In 2015, the duo released their second album Close To to a lukewarm reception compared to their previous album.

2017 - 2019: The Lakeside Of Yearning and return to Malaysia
Their third album, The Lakeside Of Yearning was released in 2017. In 2019, the duo decided to return to Malaysia because 90 percent of their music is made in Malaysia. Despite the return, Fuying & Sam still has links to a Taiwanese company which helps distribute its music.

Members
He is a vegetarian/pescetarian.

Philanthropy
In July 2016, Fuying & Sam helped to raise in excess of RM 3,000 for the Pertubuhan Kebajikan Seri Cahaya, through the Love + Help charity concert in Penang. The duo also performed at the World Vision Malaysia 30-Hour Famine 2016, an event aimed to raise funds for communities living in poverty and hunger in August 2016.

Discography

Singles / Mini Albums

Albums

Filmography

Concerts / Showcase

Awards

References

External links
Official Facebook Page
Official YouTube Channel
Official Instagram 
Official Weibo

Musical groups established in 2012
Malaysian musical groups
Mandopop musicians
2012 establishments in Malaysia